The 1993 WTA Tour, also known by its sponsored name Kraft General Foods World Tour, was the elite tour for professional women's tennis organised by the Women's Tennis Association (WTA). The WTA Tour included the four Grand Slam tournaments, the WTA Tour Championships and the WTA Tier I, Tier II, Tier III and Tier IV events.  ITF tournaments are not part of the WTA Tour, although they award points for the WTA World Ranking.

Schedule
The table below shows the 1993 WTA Tour schedule.

Key

January

February

March

April

May

June

July

August

September

October

November

Rankings
Below are the 1993 WTA year-end rankings in both singles and doubles competition:

Statistical Information

List of players and titles won, last name alphabetically:
Steffi Graf – Delray Beach, Hilton Head, Berlin, Roland Garros, Wimbledon, San Diego, Canada, US Open, Leipzig, Tour Championships (10)
Conchita Martínez – Brisbane, Houston, Rome, Stratton Mountain, Philadelphia (5)
Martina Navratilova – Tokyo, Paris, Eastbourne, Manhattan Beach, Oakland (5)
Arantxa Sánchez Vicario – Miami, Amelia Island, Barcelona, Hamburg (4)
Yayuk Basuki – Pattaya City, Jakarta (2)
Radka Bobková – Liege, Palermo (2)
Amanda Coetzer – Melbourne, Tokyo Indoors (2)
Zina Garrison-Jackson – Oklahoma City, Budapest (2)
Linda Harvey-Wild – San Juan, Sapporo (2)
Manuela Maleeva-Fragniere – Linz, Zurich (2)
Natalia Medvedeva – Prague 2, Essen (2)
Jana Novotná – Osaka, Brighton (2)
Monica Seles – Australian Open, Chicago (2)
Wang Shi-ting – Hong Kong, Taiwan (2)
Jennifer Capriati – Sydney (1)
Kimiko Date – Tokyo 2 (1)
Lindsay Davenport – Lucerne (1)
Mary Joe Fernández – Indian Wells (1)
Marzia Grossi – San Marino (1)
Sabine Hack – Curitiba (1)
Anke Huber – Kitzbühel (1)
Elena Likhovtseva – Montpellier (1)
Lori McNeil – Birmingham (1)
Mary Pierce – Filderstadt (1)
Nicole Provis – Kuala Lumpur (1)
Elna Reinach – Auckland (1)
Larisa Savchenko – Schenectady (1)
Naoko Sawamatsu – Strasbourg (1)
Brenda Schultz – Taranto (1)
Nathalie Tauziat – Quebec City (1)

The following players won their first title:
 Amanda Coetzer
 Elna Reinach
 Radka Bobková
 Linda Harvey-Wild
 Marzia Grossi
 Wang Shi-ting
 Elena Likhovtseva

See also
 1993 ATP Tour

References

External links
 WTA Finals – 2014 to 1971 (PDF)

 
WTA Tour
1993 WTA Tour